The Fort Bonifacio boundary dispute is a territorial disagreement between local governments in the Filipino cities of Makati and Taguig, and the municipality of Pateros. The dispute also includes the financial district of Bonifacio Global City (BGC).

Taguig has administration over Bonifacio Global City and some territory to its south as part of Fort Bonifacio. In addition, Pinagsama exercises control over the McKinley Hill area and Palar Village, while Barangay Ususan controls some exclaves along Circumferential Road 5 (C-5), such as Logcom Village, Wildcat Village, and Aranai. Makati claims the main BGC area, Palar Village and the lands along C5 up to the walls of Heritage Park to be under the jurisdiction of its barangays Post Proper Northside and Post Proper Southside, while Ususan's exclaves along the eastbound portion of C-5 are also claimed by Barangay Rizal and Barangay Pembo. Pateros claims to control the so-called Embo barangays of Makati and some barangays under Taguig. Pateros claim includes Bonifacio Global City.

Background

According to their claim, this also included barangays Comembo, Pembo, East Rembo, West Rembo, Cembo, South Cembo and Pitogo (which are now part of Makati) and Bonifacio Global City, Aranai, Ususan, and Palar in Pinagsama (which was made part of Taguig), based on documents and official maps obtained from several libraries and offices, including the United States Library of Congress and National Archives.

Pateros' decrease in the territory was accounted to a cadastral mapping in Metro Manila conducted in 1978. The late Pateros Mayor Nestor Ponce challenged the map through an objection letter dated June 23, 1978. In January 1986, President Ferdinand Marcos issued Proclamation No. 2475, which stated that Fort Bonifacio is in Makati, remaining open for disposition. Following these events, a boundary dispute arose which moved Pateros to request a dialogue with the Municipal Council of Makati in 1990. Pateros also filed a complaint against Taguig at the Makati RTC in 1996, but the trial court dismissed the case for lack of jurisdiction. The case was moved to the Court of Appeals in 2003 but was denied. The same case was moved to the Supreme Court in 2009, and it was denied again.

In 1993, the municipal government of Taguig filed a case against Makati before the Pasig Regional Trial Court (RTC), contending "that the areas comprising the Enlisted Men's Barangays (EMBOs), as well as the area referred to as Inner Fort in Fort Bonifacio, were within its territory and jurisdiction." The Pasig court ruled in favor of Taguig in 2011. Makati filed a motion for reconsideration at the Pasig RTC. At the same time, the city filed a petition for an annulment of judgment with the Court of Appeals.

The city governments of Makati and Taguig fought over the jurisdiction of Fort Bonifacio because of the area's growth potential. A portion of the base, including the Libingan ng mga Bayani and the Manila American Cemetery, lies within Taguig, while the northern portion, where the Global City development is centered, was considered part of Makati. A 2003 ruling by a judge in the Pasig Regional Trial Court upheld the jurisdiction of Taguig over the entirety of Fort Bonifacio, including the Bonifacio Global City and Pinagsama.

Supreme Court
On June 27, 2008, through Associate Justice Leonardo Quisumbing, the suit of the Makati was dismissed, seeking to nullify Special Patents 3595 and 3596 signed by Fidel Ramos conveying to the Bases Conversion and Development Authority public land in Fort Bonifacio, Taguig. Due to a pending civil case filed by the Taguig city government asking the court to define its territorial boundaries, Makati cannot halt Taguig from collecting taxes on land located in Fort Bonifacio because it does not have any other sufficient source of sufficient income.

Further rulings and appeals
On June 16, 2009, the Supreme Court, through Associate Justice Antonio Eduardo B. Nachura, denied Pateros’ petition against Taguig, but ruled that the boundary dispute should be settled amicably by their respective legislative bodies based on Section 118(d) of the Local Government Code. Pursuant to the decision, Pateros invited Taguig to a council-to-council dialogue on October 8, 2009. Four meetings were held and at the fourth dialogue on November 23, 2009, a joint resolution was made stating that Taguig was requesting a tripartite conference between Pateros, Taguig and Makati.

On August 5, 2013, after a year and a half of deliberations, the 20-year-long battle was decided in a 37-page decision was written by Justice Marlene Gonzales-Sison of the Court of Appeals. The ruling says that jurisdiction over Fort Bonifacio has reverted to Makati from Taguig. The court upheld the constitutionality of Presidential Proclamations 2475 and 518, both of which confirmed that portions of the aforementioned military camps are under the jurisdiction of Makati. The decision also cited the fact that voters from the barangays that are subject of the dispute between Makati and Taguig have long been registered as voters of Makati, thus bolstering the former's jurisdiction over Fort Bonifacio. Taguig Mayor Lani Cayetano, however, maintained that this decision was not yet final and executory, and asked Justice Gonzales-Sison to recuse from the case as it was discovered that her family has close ties with the Binays of Makati.

On August 22, 2013, the Taguig city government filed a motion for reconsideration before the Court of Appeals' Sixth Division affirming its claim on Fort Bonifacio. With the filing of the motion, Taguig asserted jurisdiction over Fort Bonifacio. According to Taguig's legal department, jurisprudence, and the rules of procedure in the country's justice system, all say that the filing of a motion for reconsideration suspends the execution of a decision and puts it in limbo. On June 15, 2016, in a 27-page decision by the Second Division of the Supreme Court, the decision found Makati guilty of direct contempt for forum shopping.

On October 3, 2017, the Court of Appeals upheld its final decision in favor of the city government of Taguig and not Makati. The Supreme Court also found Makati guilty of forum shopping after simultaneously appealing the Pasig RTC ruling and filing a petition before the Court of Appeals, both seeking the same relief. Though Makati, maintained its claim over the disputed area.

In a decision released on April 27, 2022, the Supreme Court upheld the 2011 Pasig City RTC ruling that declared that the  Bonifacio Global City complex, along with several surrounding barangays of Makati (Pembo, Comembo, Cembo, South Cembo, West Rembo, East Rembo and Pitogo), was under the jurisdiction of the Taguig city government. However Makati released a statement that it would continue exercising jurisdiction over areas it controlled until it received the official copy of the decision.

External links
 Municipality of Makati (Now City of Makati) vs. Municipality of Taguig (Now City of Taguig) G.R. No. 235316. December 01, 2021 – Supreme Court of the Philippines

References

Internal territorial disputes of the Philippines
Boundary dispute
History of Metro Manila
Makati
Taguig
Pateros